Chandrayaan-3 is a planned third lunar exploration mission by the Indian Space Research Organisation (ISRO).

Following Chandrayaan-2, where a last-minute glitch in the soft landing guidance software led to the failure of the lander's soft landing attempt after a successful orbital insertion, another lunar mission for demonstrating soft landing was proposed. Chandrayaan-3 will be a mission repeat of Chandrayaan-2 but will only include a lander and rover similar to that of Chandrayaan-2. It will not have an orbiter, but its propulsion module will behave like a communications relay satellite.The Propulsion module will carry the lander and rover configuration till 100 km lunar orbit. The Propulsion module has Spectro-polarimetry of Habitable Planet Earth (SHAPE) payload to study the spectral and Polari metric measurements of Earth from the lunar orbit. The spacecraft is scheduled to be launched in June 2023.

Background 
In the second phase of the Chandrayaan programme to demonstrate soft landing on the Moon, ISRO launched Chandrayaan-2 on board a  Launch Vehicle Mark-3 (LVM 3) launch vehicle consisting of an orbiter, a lander and a rover. The lander was scheduled to touchdown on the lunar surface in September 2019 to deploy the Pragyan rover.

Earlier reports had emerged about a collaboration with Japan on a mission to the lunar south pole where India would be providing the lander while Japan would provide both launcher and rover. The mission may include site sampling and lunar night survival technologies.

The subsequent failure of the Vikram lander led to the pursuit of another mission to demonstrate the landing capabilities needed for the Lunar Polar Exploration Mission proposed in partnership with Japan for 2024. During mission critical flight operations, the European Space Tracking (ESTRACK) operated by European Space Agency (ESA) will support the mission according to a contract.

Design 

The lander for Chandrayaan-3 will have only four throttle-able engines, unlike Vikram on Chandrayaan-2 which had five 800 Newtons engines with a fifth one being centrally mounted with a fixed thrust. Additionally, the Chandrayaan-3 lander will be equipped with a Laser Doppler Velocimeter (LDV). The impact legs are made stronger compared to Chandrayaan-2 and increased instrumentation redundancy. ISRO is working on improving the structural rigidity and adding multiple contingency systems.

Funding 

See also 

 Moon landing
 LUPEX
 Chandrayaan-2
 Indian Space Research Organisation

References

External links 

Missions to the Moon
Lunar rovers
Indian lunar exploration programme
2023 in spaceflight
2023 in India
ISRO space probes